Problacmaea is a genus of sea snails, true limpets, marine gastropod mollusks in the family Erginidae.

Species
 Problacmaea apicina (Dall, 1879)
 Problacmaea moskalevi Golikov & Kussakin, 1972
 Problacmaea sybaritica (Dall, 1871)

References

 Chernyshev, A.V. (2018). Erginidae fam. nov. (Patellogastropoda) – a new family of limpets. Bulletin of the Russian Far East Malacological Society. 22(1-2): 63-68.

External links
 Golikov, A.N. & Kussakin, O.G. (1972). Sur la biologie de la reproduction des patelles de la familie Tecturidae Gastropoda: Docoglossa) et sur la position systématique de ses subdivisions. Malacologia. 11(2): 287-294

Erginidae